Michael Kieran Harvey (born 7 July 1961) is an Australian pianist and composer whose career has been notable for its diversity and wide repertoire.  He is renowned for commissioning, performing and composing new music.  He has especially promoted the works of Australian composers, such as Carl Vine, most of whose piano music he has recorded and much of which was written for him.  He is also particularly associated with the piano music of Olivier Messiaen.

According to critic Clive O'Connell in The Age: "Few Australian pianists can touch Michael Kieran Harvey, one of the most exciting exponents of contemporary music in the country".

Biography

Family
Michael Kieran Harvey was born in Sydney in 1961. He says that as a child he had great difficulty in coming to terms with being a musician, as he played four different codes of football and was also involved in surf lifesaving. His brother, Dominic, was head of brass at the Australian National University and is a noted conductor; his sister Bernadette, is a pianist. and another sister, Rowan Harvey-Martin, is a violinist and noted conductor. His mother, Anne (a student of Alexander Sverjensky), abandoned her plans to become a concert pianist when her own father died in her mid-teens. His father, Francis, was a journalist and for a time a freelance cellist. He is married to pianist Arabella Teniswood-Harvey. Michael has two children, Isabella and Raphael, by his first marriage, to pianist Denise Papaluca.

Background
Harvey studied piano at the Canberra School of Music with Alan Jenkins, at the Sydney Conservatorium of Music under Gordon Watson, and at the Franz Liszt Academy of Music, Budapest, under Sándor Falvai. He first came to international prominence by jointly winning, with Edith Chen, the 1993 International Solo Piano Competition founded by Ivo Pogorelić in Pasadena, California, in which he performed Carl Vine's Piano Sonata No. 1.

At the time, this was the world's richest piano competition. He entered the competition not believing he could win, but as an excuse to go to Los Angeles to see Frank Zappa, who was very ill, and to seek permission to play his piano music in public. However, Zappa died of cancer on the day of the finals and Harvey did not meet him. His manager from Columbia Artists Management was Ronald Wilford, who was Glenn Gould's manager, and at that stage Ivo Pogorelić's own manager.

Career

He has premiered many new Australian concertos by composers such as Yitzhak Yedid, Carl Vine, Nigel Westlake, Paul Grabowsky, Larry Sitsky, Barry Conyngham, Don Kay, and Eve Duncan.

He has given Australian premieres of important international works by Louis Andriessen, Stefan Wolpe, Donald Martino, Frank Zappa, Jon Lord (of Deep Purple), Keith Emerson (of Emerson, Lake & Palmer), Beat Furrer and Milton Babbitt.

Harvey has worked with conductors such as Edo de Waart, Reinbert de Leeuw, Diego Masson, Markus Stenz and Kristjan Järvi, and has collaborated with the Arditti Quartet, the Netherlands and Luxembourg Philharmonics, Jon Lord, Keith Emerson, and Paul Grabowsky. He regularly appears as soloist with Australian symphony orchestras.

He has performed and recorded most of Olivier Messiaen's works involving piano to high critical acclaim.  In 2005 he released a live 3-CD recording of the Australian premiere of the entire Catalogue d'oiseaux featuring Peter Cundall as narrator. Despite his close association with Messiaen's music Harvey is an atheist, who describes himself as having escaped Catholicism in his early teens, as did Frank Zappa.

He has recorded Carl Vine's complete piano music (including the 12 Preludes of 2006), much of which was written for him.  He commissioned Nigel Westlake's Piano Sonatas I (1998) and II (2004) and Piano Concerto (2000) and gave the premiere performances. Harvey has commissioned and recorded major Australian piano cycles by Larry Sitsky, Mike Nock, and Graham Hair, and promoted major works by Helen Gifford, Warren Burt, Eve Duncan, Tom Henry, and Brett Dean.

Compositions
Harvey holds a PhD in composition and has recorded much of his own music.

Recordings

Legacy
In 2005 the Michael Kieran Harvey Scholarship was established and funded by Susan Mary Remington in honour of his contribution to Australian music, and to encourage future directions in keyboard art music.
Recipients: 2006 – Cameron Roberts; 2008 – Ashley Hribar; 2010 – Zubin Kanga; 2012 – Aura Go and Adam Cook; 2014 – Dr James Hullick; 2016 – Alex Raineri and Nicholas Young; 2018 – Rohan Drape; 2020 – Dr Anthony Pateras; 2022 - Ayesha Gough.

Honours and awards
 Joint Grand Prix in the 1993 International Solo Piano Competition (usually referred to as the Ivo Pogorelić Piano Competition, after its founder) in Pasadena, with Edith Chen
 Debussy Medal (Paris 1985)
 Finalist, Inaugural International Franz Liszt Piano Competition, Utrecht, Netherlands (1986)
 Awarded the Australian Government's Centenary Medal for services to Australian music (2002)
 Three times nominated for the Helpmann Award

ARIA Music Awards
The ARIA Music Awards is an annual awards ceremony that recognises excellence, innovation, and achievement across all genres of Australian music.

 
|-
| 2000
| Messiaen: Twenty Contemplations of the Infant Jesus
| ARIA Award for Best Classical Album
| 
|-
| 2005
| Rabid Bay
| Best Classical Album
| 
|-
| 2007
| Carl Vine Piano Music 1990-2006
| Best Classical Album
| 
|-

Mo Awards
The Australian Entertainment Mo Awards (commonly known informally as the Mo Awards), were annual Australian entertainment industry awards. They recognise achievements in live entertainment in Australia from 1975 to 2016. Kieran Harvey won four awards in that time.
 (wins only)
|-
| 1996
| Michael Kieran Harvey
| Classical Performer of the Year
| 
|-
| 1997
| Michael Kieran Harvey
| Classical Performer of the Year
| 
|-
| 1998
| Bernadette Balkus and Michael Kieran Harvey
| Classical Performer of the Year
| 
|-
| 1999
| Michael Kieran Harvey
| Classical Performer of the Year
| 
|-

Sidney Myer Performing Arts Awards
The Sidney Myer Performing Arts Awards commenced in 1984 and recognise outstanding achievements in dance, drama, comedy, music, opera, circus and puppetry.

|-
| 1994 || Michael Kieran Harvey  || Individual Award || 
|-

References

External links
 Michael Kieran Harvey at the Australian Music Centre
 The Music Show with Andrew Ford
 move: Michael Kieran Harvey
 move: Catalogue d’oiseaux
 Recitals Australia, Media Information
 Sunday, 20 April 2003
 University of Tasmania Conservatorium of Music

1961 births
Living people
Australian classical pianists
Male classical pianists
Australian male composers
Australian composers
Musicians from Sydney
Sydney Conservatorium of Music alumni
21st-century classical pianists
21st-century Australian male musicians
21st-century Australian musicians